The men's pole vault event at the 1994 World Junior Championships in Athletics was held in Lisbon, Portugal, at Estádio Universitário de Lisboa on 20 and 22 July.

Medalists

Results

Final
22 July

Qualifications
20 Jul

Group A

Group B

Participation
According to an unofficial count, 26 athletes from 17 countries participated in the event.

References

Pole vault
Pole vault at the World Athletics U20 Championships